Similkameen was the name of a provincial electoral district in the Canadian province of British Columbia formed around the historic mining district of the same name.  It made its first appearance on the hustings in the election of 1903.  After the 1963 election, which was the occasion of this riding's last appearance, this electoral district was combined with Grand Forks-Greenwood to form Boundary-Similkameen for the 1966 election.

Demographics

Notable MLAs
 Lytton Wilmot Shatford (Conservative, 1903–1917)
 William Alexander McKenzie (Conservative, 1918–1933)
 Charles Herbert Percy Tupper (Liberal, 1933–1941)
 Frank Richter, Jr.  (Social Credit, 1953–1966)

Electoral history
Note:  Winners of each election are in bold.

|Liberal
|William Alexander McLean
|align="right"|214
|align="right"|41.72%
|align="right"|
|align="right"|unknown
|- bgcolor="white"
!align="right" colspan=3|Total valid votes
!align="right"|513 
!align="right"|100.00%
!align="right"|
|- bgcolor="white"
!align="right" colspan=3|Total rejected ballots
!align="right"|
!align="right"|
!align="right"|
|- bgcolor="white"
!align="right" colspan=3|Turnout
!align="right"|%
!align="right"|
!align="right"|
|}

|Liberal
|Curtis Smith
|align="right"|200
|align="right"|37.95%
|align="right"|
|align="right"|unknown

|- bgcolor="white"
!align="right" colspan=3|Total valid votes
!align="right"|527
!align="right"|100.00%
!align="right"|
|- bgcolor="white"
!align="right" colspan=3|Total rejected ballots
!align="right"|
!align="right"|
!align="right"|
|- bgcolor="white"
!align="right" colspan=3|Turnout
!align="right"|%
!align="right"|
!align="right"|
|}

 
|Liberal
|Richard Elmhirst
|align="right"|205
|align="right"|31.78%
|align="right"|
|align="right"|unknown
|- bgcolor="white"
!align="right" colspan=3|Total valid votes
!align="right"|645
!align="right"|100.00%
!align="right"|
|- bgcolor="white"
!align="right" colspan=3|Total rejected ballots
!align="right"|
!align="right"|
!align="right"|
|- bgcolor="white"
!align="right" colspan=3|Turnout
!align="right"|%
!align="right"|
!align="right"|
|- bgcolor="white"
!align="right" colspan=7|1  Also spelled Elmhurst.
|}

|- bgcolor="white"
!align="right" colspan=3|Total valid votes
!align="right"|n/a
!align="right"|100.00%
!align="right"|
|- bgcolor="white"
!align="right" colspan=3|Total rejected ballots
!align="right"|
!align="right"|
!align="right"|
|- bgcolor="white"
!align="right" colspan=3|Turnout
!align="right"|%
!align="right"|
!align="right"|
|}

 
|Liberal
|Robert Scott Conklin
|align="right"|523
|align="right"|44.59%
|align="right"|
|align="right"|unknown
|- bgcolor="white"
!align="right" colspan=3|Total valid votes
!align="right"|1,173 	
!align="right"|100.00%
!align="right"|
|- bgcolor="white"
!align="right" colspan=3|Total rejected ballots
!align="right"|
!align="right"|
!align="right"|
|- bgcolor="white"
!align="right" colspan=3|Turnout
!align="right"|%
!align="right"|
!align="right"|
|}

 
|Liberal
|Edward John Chambers
|align="right"|1,264
|align="right"|48.28%
|align="right"|
|align="right"|unknown
|- bgcolor="white"
!align="right" colspan=3|Total valid votes
!align="right"|2,618
!align="right"|100.00%
!align="right"|
|- bgcolor="white"
!align="right" colspan=3|Total rejected ballots
!align="right"|
!align="right"|
!align="right"|
|- bgcolor="white"
!align="right" colspan=3|Turnout
!align="right"|%
!align="right"|
!align="right"|
|}
  	  	  	  	 

 
|Liberal
|Zella May McGregor
|align="right"|771
|align="right"|23.36%
|align="right"|
|align="right"|unknown
|- bgcolor="white"
!align="right" colspan=3|Total valid votes
!align="right"|3,301	
!align="right"|100.00%
!align="right"|
|- bgcolor="white"
!align="right" colspan=3|Total rejected ballots
!align="right"|
!align="right"|
!align="right"|
|- bgcolor="white"
!align="right" colspan=3|Turnout
!align="right"|%
!align="right"|
!align="right"|
|}

 
|Liberal
|Charles Herbert Percy Tupper 2
|align="right"|1,665
|align="right"|44.47%
|align="right"|
|align="right"|unknown
|- bgcolor="white"
!align="right" colspan=3|Total valid votes
!align="right"|3,744 
!align="right"|100.00%
!align="right"|
|- bgcolor="white"
!align="right" colspan=3|Total rejected ballots
!align="right"|63
!align="right"|
!align="right"|
|- bgcolor="white"
!align="right" colspan=3|Turnout
!align="right"|%
!align="right"|
!align="right"|
|- bgcolor="white"
!align="right" colspan=7|2  Not to be confused with Canadian Prime Minister Sir Charles Tupper or his son, Sir Charles Hibbert Tupper.
|}

 
|Liberal
|Charles Herbert Percy Tupper
|align="right"|1,765
|align="right"|43.23%
|align="right"|
|align="right"|unknown

 
|Co-operative Commonwealth Fed.
|Francis Henry (Frank) Brown
|align="right"|730
|align="right"|17.88%
|align="right"|
|align="right"|unknown

|Independent
|Thomas Heeney
|align="right"|202
|align="right"|4.95%
|align="right"|
|align="right"|unknown
|- bgcolor="white"
!align="right" colspan=3|Total valid votes
!align="right"| 4,083
!align="right"|100.00%
!align="right"|
|- bgcolor="white"
!align="right" colspan=3|Total rejected ballots
!align="right"|81
!align="right"|
!align="right"|
|- bgcolor="white"
!align="right" colspan=3|Turnout
!align="right"|%
!align="right"|
!align="right"|
|}
  	  	  	  	   	 

 
|Liberal
|Charles Herbert Percy Tupper
|align="right"|2,266
|align="right"|43.55%
|align="right"|
|align="right"|unknown

 
|Co-operative Commonwealth Fed.
|Francis Henry (Frank) Brown
|align="right"|807
|align="right"|15.51%
|align="right"|
|align="right"|unknown
|- bgcolor="white"
!align="right" colspan=3|Total valid votes
!align="right"|5,203
!align="right"|100.00%
!align="right"|
|- bgcolor="white"
!align="right" colspan=3|Total rejected ballots
!align="right"|71
!align="right"|
!align="right"|
|- bgcolor="white"
!align="right" colspan=3|Turnout
!align="right"|%
!align="right"|
!align="right"|
|}

 
|Co-operative Commonwealth Fed.
|George Bernard Webber
|align="right"|2,601
|align="right"|41.16%
|align="right"|
|align="right"|unknown
 
|Liberal
|Charles Herbert Percy Tupper
|align="right"|1,965
|align="right"|31.10%
|align="right"|
|align="right"|unknown

|- bgcolor="white"
!align="right" colspan=3|Total valid votes
!align="right"|6,319 
!align="right"|100.00%
!align="right"|
|- bgcolor="white"
!align="right" colspan=3|Total rejected ballots
!align="right"|118
!align="right"|
!align="right"|
|- bgcolor="white"
!align="right" colspan=3|Turnout
!align="right"|%
!align="right"|
!align="right"|
|}

 
|Co-operative Commonwealth Fed.
|Bernard George Webber
|align="right"|2,591
|align="right"|42.91%
|align="right"|
|align="right"|unknown
|- bgcolor="white"
!align="right" colspan=3|Total valid votes
!align="right"|6,038 
!align="right"|100.00%
!align="right"|
|- bgcolor="white"
!align="right" colspan=3|Total rejected ballots
!align="right"|53
!align="right"|
!align="right"|
|- bgcolor="white"
!align="right" colspan=3|Turnout
!align="right"|%
!align="right"|
!align="right"|
|}

 
|Co-operative Commonwealth Fed.
|Bernard George Webber
|align="right"|4,028
|align="right"|41.22%
|align="right"|
|align="right"|unknown
|- bgcolor="white"
!align="right" colspan=3|Total valid votes
!align="right"|9,772  
!align="right"|100.00%
!align="right"|
|- bgcolor="white"
!align="right" colspan=3|Total rejected ballots
!align="right"|284
!align="right"|
!align="right"|
|- bgcolor="white"
!align="right" colspan=3|Turnout
!align="right"|%
!align="right"|
!align="right"|
|}

 
|Co-operative Commonwealth Fed.
|Harold Sidney Kenyon
|align="right"|3,433          			 	 		 	 		
|align="right"|32.02%
|align="right"|4,668
|align="right"|49.77%
|align="right"|
|align="right"|unknown
 
|B.C. Social Credit League
|Harry Denyer Francis
|align="right"|3,344
|align="right"|31.19%
|align="right"|4,712
|align="right"|50.23%
|align="right"|
|align="right"|unknown
 
|Liberal
|Maurice Patrick Finnerty
|align="right"|2,545      
|align="right"|23.73%
|align="right"| - 
|align="right"| -.- %
|align="right"|
|align="right"|unknown
|P-C
|Edward Titchmarsh
|align="right"|1401     
|align="right"|14%
|align="right"| - 
|align="right"| -.- %
|align="right"|
|align="right"|unknown
|- bgcolor="white"
!align="right" colspan=3|Total valid votes
!align="right"|10,723    
!align="right"|100.00%
!align="right"| 9,380 
|align="right"|
|align="right"|
|- bgcolor="white"
!align="right" colspan=3|Total rejected ballots
!align="right"|296
!align="right"|
!align="right"|
!align="right"|
!align="right"|
|- bgcolor="white"
!align="right" colspan=3|Turnout
!align="right"|%
!align="right"|
!align="right"|
!align="right"|
!align="right"|
|- bgcolor="white"
!align="right" colspan=7|3  Preferential ballot.  First and final of three counts only shown.
|}

 
|Co-operative Commonwealth Fed.
|Harold Sidney Kenyon
|align="right"|3,419
|align="right"|33.14%
|align="right"|4,105
|align="right"|43.11%
|align="right"|
|align="right"|unknown
 
|Liberal
|James Bowie Fairley
|align="right"|2,109
|align="right"|20.44%
|align="right"| - 
|align="right"| -.- %
|align="right"|
|align="right"|unknown

|- bgcolor="white"
!align="right" colspan=3|Total valid votes
!align="right"|10,316
!align="right"|100.00%
!align="right"|9,523 
|align="right"|
|align="right"|
|- bgcolor="white"
!align="right" colspan=3|Total rejected ballots
!align="right"|347
!align="right"|
!align="right"|
!align="right"|
!align="right"|
|- bgcolor="white"
!align="right" colspan=3|Turnout
!align="right"|%
!align="right"|
!align="right"|
!align="right"|
!align="right"|
|- bgcolor="white"
!align="right" colspan=7|4  Preferential ballot.  First and second of three counts only shown.
|}

 
|Liberal
|Frank William Laird
|align="right"|1,181
|align="right"|37.94%
|align="right"|
|align="right"|unknown
 
|Co-operative Commonwealth Fed.
|Stephen Archibald Mepham
|align="right"|2,200
|align="right"|22.87%
|align="right"|
|align="right"|unknown
 
|Progressive Conservative
|James Douglas Southworth
|align="right"|487 	
|align="right"|5.06%
|align="right"|
|align="right"|unknown
|- bgcolor="white"
!align="right" colspan=3|Total valid votes
!align="right"|9,620
!align="right"|100.00%
!align="right"|
|- bgcolor="white"
!align="right" colspan=3|Total rejected ballots
!align="right"|90
!align="right"|
!align="right"|
|- bgcolor="white"
!align="right" colspan=3|Turnout
!align="right"|%
!align="right"|
!align="right"|
|}

 
|CCF
|Francis Douglas Stuart
|align="right"|3,151
|align="right"|30.77%
|align="right"|
|align="right"|unknown
 
|Liberal
|Johannes Joseph Winkelaar
|align="right"|1,454
|align="right"|14.20%
|align="right"|
|align="right"|unknown
 
|Progressive Conservative
|Winnifred Odetta Mathias
|align="right"|840 	
|align="right"|8.20%
|align="right"|
|align="right"|unknown
|- bgcolor="white"
!align="right" colspan=3|Total valid votes
!align="right"|10,242 	 
!align="right"|100.00%
!align="right"|
|- bgcolor="white"
!align="right" colspan=3|Total rejected ballots
!align="right"|75
!align="right"|
!align="right"|
|- bgcolor="white"
!align="right" colspan=3|Turnout
!align="right"|%
!align="right"|
!align="right"|
|}

 
|Liberal
|Alwyn Day Coleman Washington
|align="right"|1,423
|align="right"|13.61%
|align="right"|
|align="right"|unknown
 
|Progressive Conservative
|Evelyn Annie McElroy
|align="right"|1,303 	 	
|align="right"|12.46%
|align="right"|
|align="right"|unknown
|- bgcolor="white"
!align="right" colspan=3|Total valid votes
!align="right"|10,455 
!align="right"|100.00%
!align="right"|
|- bgcolor="white"
!align="right" colspan=3|Total rejected ballots
!align="right"|86
!align="right"|
!align="right"|
|- bgcolor="white"
!align="right" colspan=3|Turnout
!align="right"|%
!align="right"|
!align="right"|
|}

The riding was redistributed following the 1963 election.  The main successor riding was Boundary-Similkameen.

Sources 
Elections BC Historical Returns

Former provincial electoral districts of British Columbia